Nicolas Bäriswyl (born 10 April 1977) is a Swiss sprinter. He competed in the men's 4 × 400 metres relay at the 2000 Summer Olympics.

References

1977 births
Living people
Athletes (track and field) at the 2000 Summer Olympics
Swiss male sprinters
Olympic athletes of Switzerland
Place of birth missing (living people)